Michał Przybyła (born 1 July 1994) is a Polish footballer who plays as a forward for Budowlani Murzynowo.

Career
On 28 September 2018, Przybyła joined Kotwica Kołobrzeg. On 12 March 2019, he moved to Stilon Gorzów Wielkopolski. Four months later, he left the club to join Warta Gorzów Wielkopolski ahead of the 2019–20 season.

References

External links
 
 

Polish footballers
1994 births
Living people
Ekstraklasa players
I liga players
II liga players
III liga players
Korona Kielce players
Widzew Łódź players
Chojniczanka Chojnice players
Warta Poznań players
Kotwica Kołobrzeg footballers
Stilon Gorzów Wielkopolski players
People from Busko County
Association football forwards